Licania velutina is a species of plant in the family Chrysobalanaceae. It is endemic to Ecuador.  Its natural habitat is subtropical or tropical moist lowland forests.

References

velutina
Endemic flora of Ecuador
Near threatened flora of South America
Taxonomy articles created by Polbot